Dendrothele is a genus of fungi in the family Corticiaceae. According to a 2008 estimate, the genus has 36 widely distributed species.

Species
Dendrothele acerina
Dendrothele alba
Dendrothele alliacea
Dendrothele americana
Dendrothele amygdalispora
Dendrothele andina
Dendrothele andinopatagonica
Dendrothele asterospora
Dendrothele biapiculata
Dendrothele bispora
Dendrothele boidinii
Dendrothele candida
Dendrothele capitulata
Dendrothele commixta
Dendrothele corniculata
Dendrothele dryina
Dendrothele duthieae
Dendrothele globulispora
Dendrothele griseocana
Dendrothele incrustans
Dendrothele itihummensis
Dendrothele lemkei
Dendrothele lepra
Dendrothele macrodens
Dendrothele mangiferae
Dendrothele mexicana
Dendrothele microspora
Dendrothele moquiniarum
Dendrothele nivosa
Dendrothele pachysterigmata
Dendrothele pitrae
Dendrothele pulvinata
Dendrothele seriata
Dendrothele strumosa
Dendrothele tanzaniana
Dendrothele tetracornis
Dendrothele tuberculata
Dendrothele wojewodae

References

Corticiales
Agaricomycetes genera
Taxa named by Franz Xaver Rudolf von Höhnel
Taxa described in 1907